Anolis lemniscatus is a species of lizard in the family Dactyloidae. The species is found in Ecuador.

References

Anoles
Endemic fauna of Ecuador
Reptiles of Ecuador
Reptiles described in 1898
Taxa named by George Albert Boulenger